Ariana Brown is an American spoken word poet from Texas. In 2014, she was part of a winning team at the national collegiate poetry slam. Ariana Brown has won the “Best Poet” award twice at the same event. She is also a two-time recipient of the Academy of American Poets Prize. She published her debut poetry chapbook, Sana Sana, with Game Over Books in early 2020.

Early life and education  

Brown was born in San Antonio, Texas. Her father was a Black American and her mother is Mexican-American. Brown identifies as a Black Mexican American person. Growing up, Brown struggled to find representations of herself in literature, so she decided to write poetry for young women who struggle to feel represented. She was also inspired by Black movement leaders, including Malcolm X. In 2011, she was a part of her first poetry slam team and performed at Brave New Voices.

Brown received her Bachelor's of Arts degree in African Diaspora Studies and Mexican American Studies from the University of Texas at Austin. She also received a Master of Fine Arts in poetry at the University of Pittsburgh and is working on a poetry manuscript about her life, the formation of a racial identity, cultural politics, and authenticity among other themes.

Brown has continued to participate in poetry slams, has performed her poetry across the United States, and often holds poetry workshops focused on writing poetry that heals.

Brown writes poetry to uplift Black people and pay homage to her ancestors and the history of her people. She wants to inspire and uplift disempowered communities through her poetry. She also uses her poetry to validate Black girl rage. Brown has been dubbed a "part-time curandera" because her poetry deals with healing issues of race, ethnicity, gender, class, and sexual orientation. She weaves contemporary issues and tensions into her poetry. Her work has been featured in PBS, Huffington Post, Blavity, For Harriet, and Remezcla among others.

Personal life 
Brown is queer.

Works 

 We Are Owed., Grieveland, July 2021.
Sana Sana (debut poetry chapbook), Game Over Books, January 2020
 LET US BE ENOUGH (debut poetry EP), February 22, 2019
 “quaker blake” Barrelhouse Magazine, December 9, 2018
 “Alternate Memory, or Love Dances Barefoot After the Men Have Disappeared” Barrelhouse Magazine, December 9, 2018
 “Introductions” Scalawag Magazine, October 1, 2018
 “In Defense of Santana’s ‘Maria Maria,’ Featuring Wyclef & the Product G&B” Rattle, January 29, 2018
 “Minute Fathers” Sidekick Lit, Issue Four
 “A Division of Gods” Winter Tangerine, 2017
 “Abuela, de Carrizo Springs” As/Us, September 17, 2017
 “Supremacy” Muzzle, June 2017
 “Nylon, Black, ‘72” BOAAT
 “At the End of the Sword” Neptantla, Issue 3
 “Always, There is Music” African Voices, July 8, 2016
 “Don’t Know Nobody from Ellis Island” Bird’s Thumb, June 2016
 “Invocation” & “Sunday Morning” HEArt Online, April 4, 2016
 “Ossuary” Rattle: Poets Respond, October 25, 2015

References

External links 

 Official website

Year of birth missing (living people)
Living people
21st-century American women writers
21st-century American poets
American women poets
LGBT Hispanic and Latino American people
Poets from Texas
Writers from San Antonio
American spoken word poets
University of Texas at Austin College of Liberal Arts alumni
American poets of Mexican descent
African-American poets
Afro-Mexican
American LGBT poets
LGBT African Americans
Queer women
Queer writers
African-American women musicians
21st-century African-American women writers
21st-century African-American writers
21st-century American LGBT people